The North Coast Regional District (until 2016 known as the Skeena–Queen Charlotte Regional District) is a quasi-municipal administrative area in British Columbia. It is located on British Columbia's west coast and includes Haida Gwaii (formerly the Queen Charlotte Islands), the largest of which are Graham Island and Moresby Island. Its administrative offices are in the City of Prince Rupert.

Demographics

Note: Totals greater than 100% due to multiple origin responses.

Electoral areas 
Area A - Skeena North: 29
Dodge Cove (unincorporated community): 29 (down from 52 in 2011)
Crippen Cove
Metlakatla
Lax Kw'alaams
Area C - Skeena South: 147
Porcher Island
Oona River (unincorporated community): 147 (up from 37 in 2011)
Humpback Bay
Hunts Inlet
Prince Rupert
Port Edward
Hartley Bay
Area D - Haida Gwaii North: 524
Rural Graham Island: 524 (down from 607 in 2006)
Tlell 
Tow Hill 
Lawn Hill 
Miller Creek
Daajing Giids (formerly Queen Charlotte)
Skidegate
Old Massett
Port Clements
Area E - Haida Gwaii South: 317
pop 2011 was 317, down from 402 in 2006
Sandspit (unincorporated community): 297 (down from 387 in 2006)

Municipalities
City of Prince Rupert: 12,220
Village of Daajing Giids: 948
Village of Masset: 940
District of Port Edward: 557
Village of Port Clements: 440

Indian reserves 
In addition to 7,700 aboriginal persons listed in the regional district's community profile at Statistics Canada, there are four separate Indian reserve communities within the regional district whose populations are not included within the regional district's figures, and which are governed separately by their respective band governments. These Indian reserves are:
Old Massett (Masset Indian Reserve No. 1);
Skidegate (Skidegate Indian Reserve No. 1);
Metlakatla; and 
Lax Kw'alaams (Port Simpson Indian Reserve No. 1).

Past naming 
The Regional District had historically been called the Skeena-Queen Charlotte Regional District, referring to its location on the Skeena River and the Queen Charlotte archipelago. Once the Queen Charlottes were renamed Haidi Gwaii to reflect their Indigenous heritage, discussions began about renaming the Regional District to reflect the update. In September 2016, letters patent were granted renaming it to the North Coast Regional District

Notes

References

External links

 
Regional districts of British Columbia